Masakazu Kamimura (上村政和, Kamimura Masakazu, born 2 October 1960) is a Japanese wrestler. He competed in the men's freestyle 68 kg at the 1984 Summer Olympics.

References

External links
 

1960 births
Living people
Japanese male sport wrestlers
Olympic wrestlers of Japan
Wrestlers at the 1984 Summer Olympics
Place of birth missing (living people)
Asian Games medalists in wrestling
Wrestlers at the 1982 Asian Games
Asian Games silver medalists for Japan
Medalists at the 1982 Asian Games
20th-century Japanese people
21st-century Japanese people
Asian Wrestling Championships medalists